Omar Abdullahi Mohamed (Arabic: عمر محمد; born 5 May 1996) is a Somali professional footballer who plays for the Somalia national team.

Early life
Omar Mohamed was born in Mogadishu, Somalia, where he lived until the age of six when his family moved to Cairo, Egypt. He moved with his family to the United States in 2005 and grew up in Columbus, Ohio.

Career

Early career
Mohamed first began playing organized soccer at the age of 12, where he played for local Columbus youth club FC Blast. At the age of 16, he began playing for the academy of Columbus Crew. He also trained and played with the first team of Columbus Crew, making four appearances for the Crew reserve team and scoring two goals. Mohamed also played one year of college soccer at Jackson College in 2015.

Professional
Mohamed signed with new United Soccer League club FC Cincinnati in January 2016.

Mohamed joined USL side Portland Timbers 2 in March 2017.

After spending time with USL League Two side Des Moines Menace, Mohamed joined USL League One side Greenville Triumph SC on February 8, 2019, ahead of their inaugural season.

Greenville opted to decline Mohamed's contract option following their 2020 season. He joined Menemenspor on January 22, 2021.

International
In September 2019, Mohamed was called into the Somalia national football team for its 2022 World Cup qualifiers against Zimbabwe. On September 5, 2019, he made his international debut for Somalia in their 1–0 win over Zimbabwe. On September 10, 2019, he scored his first international goal in Somalia's second leg qualifier against Zimbabwe at the Zimbabwe National Stadium in Harare.

In December 2019 He was again called into the Somalia national football team for Its participation in 2019 CECAFA Cup held in Kampala, Uganda. Mohamed played all the group matches for Somalia and scored the only goal Somalia has scored during the tournament. Somalia won against Burundi national football team, lost against Uganda national football team, while drawing against Djibouti national football team and Eritrea national football team without conceding a goal.

International goals
Scores and results list Somalia's goal tally first.

References

External links 
 
 
 FC Cincinnati bio

1997 births
Sportspeople from Mogadishu
Soccer players from Ohio
People from Westerville, Ohio
African-American soccer players
21st-century African-American sportspeople
Living people
Somalian emigrants to the United States
People with acquired American citizenship
American soccer players
Somalian footballers
Somalia international footballers
Association football midfielders
FC Cincinnati (2016–18) players
Portland Timbers 2 players
Des Moines Menace players
Greenville Triumph SC players
Menemenspor footballers
USL League Two players
USL League One players
USL Championship players
TFF First League players
American expatriate soccer players
Somalian expatriate footballers
Expatriate footballers in Turkey
American expatriate sportspeople in Turkey
Somalian expatriate sportspeople in Turkey

| clubs1 = FC Cincinnati
| clubs2 = Portland Timbers 2
| clubs3 = Des Moines Menace
| clubs4 = Greenville Triumph
| clubs5 = Menemenspor